Dôme is a franchise chain of European-style café restaurants based in Perth, Western Australia.

It has over 65 cafés in Australia, with most in Western Australia. Dôme has also developed a number of locations in Darwin, in addition the chain had previously opened stores in Tasmania, as well as internationally, including the United Arab Emirates, Indonesia, the Philippines, Malaysia, Bahrain, and at the Hulhumale in the Maldives.

History
It was founded by Patria Jefferies, Phil May and Phil Sexton in 1990. The initial outlet was established in Napoleon Street, Cottesloe in the early 1990s. By the early 2000s it was a significant player in the larger Australian market. There are now over 130 Dôme cafés in about eight countries. The corporate headquarters are in the former Peninsula Hotel in Maylands, Western Australia.

See also

 List of bakery cafés
 List of coffeehouse chains

References

External links
 
 

1990 establishments in Australia
Restaurants established in 1990
Food and drink companies established in 1990
Australian brands
Restaurants in Western Australia
Restaurants in Malaysia
Bakery cafés
Food and drink companies based in Perth, Western Australia
Coffeehouses and cafés in Australia